"" (Little Hans, 1899) by  (1821–1882) is a German folk song that originated in the Biedermeier period (1815–1848) of German history in the 19th century, and later became a nursery song in the early 20th century.

Background
The folk-song lyrics of Hänschen klein tell of a boy who ventures from home into the world, and returns as a man to his family. In 1900, an abridged version of Hänschen klein became a nursery song for children to sing in kindergarten. Hans is a boy who leaves home for the world, but seven years later returns to hearth and home. Little Hans leaving home left his mother bereft until his return. 

The melody of Hänschen klein is used in Lightly Row, a Mother Goose rhyme, and the children's song version, by Otto Frömmel, is the title music of the war movie Cross of Iron (1977). In the German-language version of 2001: A Space Odyssey (1968), the computer HAL 9000 sings "", while an astronaut shuts it down.

Text and lyrics 
 
Hänschen klein
Ging allein
In die weite Welt hinein.
Stock und Hut
Steht ihm gut,
Ist gar wohlgemut.
Aber Mutter weinet sehr,
Hat ja nun kein Hänschen mehr!
"Wünsch dir Glück!"
Sagt ihr Blick,
"Kehr' nur bald zurück!"

Sieben Jahr
Trüb und klar
Hänschen in der Fremde war.
Da besinnt
Sich das Kind,
Eilt nach Haus geschwind.
Doch nun ist's kein Hänschen mehr.
Nein, ein großer Hans ist er.
Braun gebrannt
Stirn und Hand.
Wird er wohl erkannt?

Eins, zwei, drei
Geh'n vorbei,
Wissen nicht, wer das wohl sei.
Schwester spricht:
"Welch Gesicht?"
Kennt den Bruder nicht.
Kommt daher die Mutter sein,
Schaut ihm kaum ins Aug hinein,
Ruft sie schon:
"Hans, mein Sohn!
Grüß dich Gott, mein Sohn!"

Literal translation
Little Hans
Went alone
Into the wide world.
Stick and hat
Suits him well
Is very cheerful.
But mother cries a lot
Hasn't got a little boy anymore!
"Wish you luck!"
Says her look
"Come back soon!"

Seven years
Cloudy and clear
Hänschen was abroad.
Think about it
The child
Hurry home quickly.
But now it's no longer a little boy.
No, he is a great Hans.
Burned brown
Forehead and hand.
Will he be recognized?

One two Three
Go by
Don't know who it is.
Sister speaks:
"What face?"
Doesn't know the brother.
Hence comes the mother,
Hardly look him in the eye
She is already calling:
"Hans, my son!
God greet you, my son!"

Faithful translation
Little Hans
Went alone
In the Wider World to roam.
Staff and hat,
Suits him that!
He is really pleased.
But his mother cries so sore
For she has no Hänschen more
"Wish you luck!"
Says her look
"Just you come back soon!"

Seven year
Cloud and clear
Hänschen wandered far and near.
Then he thinks,
"No more jinks
Speed you home right now!"
But he is Young Hans no more.
No, it's Big Hans to the fore.
Nicely tanned
Brow and hand.
Will they know him now?

One two three
Pass and see
They don’t know who that may be.
Sister says:
"Whose that face?"
Knows her brother not.
But here comes his mother nigh,
Hardly looks him in the eye
Then a cry,
"Hans, Oh my!
God’s greetings, you, my son!."

Free translation
Little John
He has gone
Out to see the world alone
Staff and hat,
Look at that,
He's one happy cat.
But his mommy cries a lot
Now she has no Johnny got.
"Fortune find,
But you mind,
Come back to your kind."

Seven years,
Joy and tears,
John in many lands appears.
Then he thought
That he ought
To go home and got.
But now he's no Johnny small,
No, he is now big John tall.
Tall and tanned,
Face and hand.
Will they know this man?

One, two, three
Pass and see,
Don't know who this man might be.
Even Sis:
"Who is this?"
Knows not who he is.
Then along comes mother dear,
Barely sees his eyes so clear,
Says: "My son,
Welcome home,
God bless you my son."

Song for children

Hänschen klein
ging allein
in die weite Welt hinein.
Stock und Hut
stehn ihm gut,
ist gar wohlgemut.
Aber Mutter weinet sehr,
hat ja nun kein Hänschen mehr.
Da besinnt
sich das Kind,
kehrt nach Haus geschwind.
Little Hans
went alone
out into the wide world.
Staff and hat
suit him well.
He is in good spirits.
But his mother cries so much,
for she no longer has little Hans.
Look! the child
changes his mind
and returns home quickly.

References

External links

Text of both versions, two MIDI renditions, ingeb.org

Volkslied
German children's songs
Songs about children
Fictional children
Fictional German people